Flatirons Community Church is a large non-denominational church in Lafayette, Colorado, approximately 10 miles east of Boulder, Colorado, United States.

History
Flatirons Community Church was launched in July 1994 as Boulder Creek Community Church, with a name change to Coal Creek Community Church in December 1994, and another name change to Flatirons Community Church in 1997. The church had about 200 in attendance by 1999, 1,700 in attendance in 2002, 7,200 in attendance in 2008, and in 2013 had an average weekly attendance of 13,000.  The church now has an average weekly attendance of close to 19,000.

The church did not immediately start construction on the land it had purchased. The Lafayette City Council approved a site plan for the new church building in November 2008, but in November 2009 the church again ran decided to change some of the plans. At that time, at a town meeting to rubberstamp the building plan changes, some local residents of nearby communities objected to the proposed  building with 1,000 parking spaces and an auditorium to seat 3,000 people on the basis that the roads could not accommodate the traffic, which would disrupt their neighborhoods. Also store owners near the existing site also objected, concerned about loss of shoppers.

In April 2010 the church was considering an alternative plan to move to two large vacant buildings in a mall across the street from their current location.

In April 2011, the church moved their then only location into their current facility, a renovated combination of two grocery stores. The building currently houses the main auditorium, which can hold 4,300 people, plus overflow in the lobby of up to 2,000 people, kids spaces, secondary auditorium for student ministries and other various events. Flatirons Academy, a K-4 Classical Christian based school, is located in a separate building, in the nearby town of Westminster. Offices are located in a separate building across the street from the main campus.

In 2014, Flatirons launched their second campus in Genesee, Colorado, and followed with a campus in Denver, which originally met in the Paramount theater but now resides in its own permanent building just south of downtown, a campus in Aurora, Longmont, an online campus that livestreams Sunday worship and messages.

The church features modern worship music, led by primarily campus specific worship leaders, alongside a Biblically-based spoken message during a typical weekend service.
The music is not limited to worship songs, but includes secular songs by popular bands such as Queen, Imagine Dragons, Foo Fighters, Coldplay, Twenty One Pilots, Bleachers, and more. The church regularly sees over 19,000 attendees per weekend over its five campuses, plus online live streams on Facebook and YouTube. Flatirons was recently ranked by Outreach Magazine as the 11th largest church in America.

References

Non-denominational Evangelical churches
Evangelical megachurches in the United States
Megachurches in Colorado
Christian organizations established in 1997
Lafayette, Colorado